Events in the year 1497 in Japan.

Incumbents
Monarch: Go-Tsuchimikado

Births
January 26 - Emperor Go-Nara (d. 1557)

 
 
Japan
Years of the 15th century in Japan